Doyle Doss is an inventor and founder of Doss Products in Eureka, California.

Doss is registered as a sex offender by the California Department of Justice, listed on the official California Megan's Law website.

Products
Kandle Heeter candle holder
Eye to Eye hummingbird feeder is a wearable hummingbird feeder.  While not wildly popular, it has a niche following and at least 700 have been sold in the United States and Canada.

References

21st-century American inventors
Living people
Year of birth missing (living people)